The Moore Haven Residential Historic District is a U.S. historic district (designated as such on June 26, 1998) located in Moore Haven, Florida. The district is bounded by Avenue J to Avenue M and 1st to 5th Streets. It contains 40 historic buildings.

References

External links

 Glades County listings at National Register of Historic Places

Geography of Glades County, Florida
Historic districts on the National Register of Historic Places in Florida
National Register of Historic Places in Glades County, Florida